Verdi Godwin BEM (11 February 1926 – 1 December 2013) was an English footballer who played as a forward in the Football League for Blackburn Rovers, Manchester City, Mansfield Town, Middlesbrough, Grimsby Town, Brentford and Stoke City. After retiring as a player, he worked as a scout.

Career
Godwin was born in Blackburn and began his career with local club Blackburn Rovers. He scored six league goals in two seasons at Ewood Park and joined Manchester City in June 1948. He scored three goals in eight matches for City before joining Stoke City, whose manager Bob McGrory saw Godwin as the answer to Stoke's goalscoring problem in 1949–50. However, despite scoring on his debut, Godwin scored just once more in the next 20 league matches and by January he was transferred to Third Division Mansfield Town in part-exchange for Harry Oscroft. Following is spell with the Stags, Godwin became a journeyman and spent short spells with Middlesbrough, Grimsby Town, Brentford, Southport, Barrow, Tranmere Rovers and finally Macclesfield.

Personal life 
After retiring from football, Godwin worked during the summer for 36 years as a lifeguard on Southport beach. He was award the British Empire Medal in recognition for his service.

Career statistics

References

External links
 

English footballers
Stoke City F.C. players
Blackburn Rovers F.C. players
Manchester City F.C. players
Mansfield Town F.C. players
Middlesbrough F.C. players
Grimsby Town F.C. players
Brentford F.C. players
Barrow A.F.C. players
Southport F.C. players
Tranmere Rovers F.C. players
English Football League players
1926 births
2013 deaths
Recipients of the British Empire Medal
Macclesfield Town F.C. players
Association football forwards